Abetxuko (in Basque and officially, according to the Royal Academy of the Basque language Abetxuku, Abechuco in Spanish) is a village in the municipality of Vitoria-Gasteiz in Álava, Basque Country, Spain. It is located on the outskirts of Vitoria.

History 
Abetxuko was first mentioned in the San Millán de la Cogolla cartulary of 1025, where it appeared under the name Avoggoco. In 1257 and 1332 it appeared as Abuchucu. In 1481 it was mentioned both as Abechuco as well as Abechucu. In various sixteenth- and seventeenth-century documents it was mentioned as Abechucu or Abechuqu, as well as Avechuco. It was from the seventeenth century that the modern form, Abechuco, started to be more widely used. At first the Basque name of the town was a simple adaptation to the Basque spelling, which is the one that was formalized. However, in 2001 the Royal Academy of the Basque Language proposed the form Abetxuku as the name of the Basque population. One of the suggested etymologies for the name of the village is 'place of blueberries' Basque ahabi + txoko.

As a former village on the outskirts of Vitoria, it was definitively linked to the jurisdiction of the town of Vitoria, following a lawsuit that it had with the Brotherhood of Arriaga in the fourteenth century. King Alfonso XI granted Vitoria jurisdiction over Abetxuko and about 41 other villages that were in dispute between the municipality of Vitoria and the Brotherhood of Álava.

Population 
Abetxuko has maintained a modest population size up to the late 1950s. It was the largest of the towns that grew at that time on the outskirts of the city of Vitoria, Relying on the existing rural settlement, the urbanization of Abetxuko, was promoted in 1957 by the City and Municipal Savings Bank of Vitoria, as well as a complex on the outskirts of Vitoria, and away from the city center (According to the municipal project (".. workers to live near their workplace "). It was created to accommodate the growing internal migration (Andalusian, Leon, Extremadura, Galicia, Castile ...). Its population rose to 2775 inhabitants by 1966. The population as of 1 January 2012 was 3327 inhabitants.

Construction 
Abetxuko was built in two phases, with the first single-family buildings (some built by the owners themselves) and blocks in the second phase. At present, these prejudices are practically nonexistent and given the growth of the city, is already integrated in it. The construction of a sculptural bridge and the arrival of the tramway in July 2009 has contributed significantly to this. They have built new public and private housing. And the paradox is that the once reviled "houses" of Abetxuko, are now coveted objects of desire for most of Vitoria. Abetxuko is much improved.

Monuments 
The primitive village church of San Miguel, of Romanesque architecture from the twelfth century, successively restored in the seventeenth and twentieth century, inside is Cristo en Cruz (Christ on the Cross), from the former monastery of Santa Catalina in the Badaya mountains. The steeple towards the west is from the twelfth century while the lateral arched and vaulted chapels are from the sixteenth century.
San José Obrero Parish Church is a modern temple, opened in 1961. Its architect was Ignacio Lasquiver Urquiola. The chapel has a Marian image from the eighteenth, from Gamboa.

Seventeenth century stone bridge over the Zadorra River.

References 

Populated places in Álava
Vitoria-Gasteiz